Richard Sieuchan (born 15 May 1961) is a Trinidadian cricketer. He played in seven first-class and nine List A matches for Trinidad and Tobago from 1986 to 1991.

See also
 List of Trinidadian representative cricketers

References

External links
 

1961 births
Living people
Trinidad and Tobago cricketers